Listed below are the dates and results for the 1970 FIFA World Cup qualification rounds for the Asian and Oceanian zone (AFC and OFC). For an overview of the qualification rounds, see the article 1970 FIFA World Cup qualification.

North Korea withdrew before the matches were played as they refused to play with Israel.

Format
There would be three rounds of play:
First Round: Israel, New Zealand and Rhodesia received byes and advanced to the Second Round directly. The remaining 3 teams, Australia, Japan and South Korea, played against each other twice in South Korea. The group winner would advance to the Second Round.
Second Round: The 4 teams were divided into 2 groups of 2 teams each. The teams played against each other twice. The group winners would advance to the Final Round.
Final Round: The 2 teams played against each other on a home-and-away basis. The winner would qualify.

First round
All matches played in Seoul, South Korea.

Australia advanced to the Second Round.

Second round

Group 1

Australia and Rhodesia finished level on points, and a play-off was played to decide who would advance to the Final Round.

Australia advanced to the Final Round.

Group 2

Israel advanced to the Final Round.
North Korea, despite their good performance in the previous tournament staged in England in 1966, refused to play in Israel.

Final round

Israel qualified.

Qualified teams
The following team from AFC qualified for the final tournament.

1 Bold indicates champions for that year. Italic indicates hosts for that year.

Goalscorers

4 goals

 Tom McColl

3 goals

 Mordechai Spiegler

2 goals

 Ray Baartz
 Johnny Watkiss
 Yehoshua Feigenbaum
 Giora Spiegel
 Teruki Miyamoto
 Bobby Chalmers
 Jeong Gang-Ji
 Park Soo-Il

1 goal

 Willie Rutherford
 Johnny Warren
 Yasuyuki Kuwahara
 Masashi Watanabe
 Kim Ki-Bok
 Lee Yi-Woo

1 own goal

 David Zeman (playing against Israel)
 Aritatsu Ogi (playing against Australia)
 Phillemon Tegire (playing against Australia)

Notes

References

AFC and OFC
FIFA World Cup qualification (AFC)
FIFA World Cup qualification (OFC)
Qual
qual